= Kampung Nagalang =

Village in Labuan, Malaysia

Kampung Nagalang is a village in Federal Territory of Labuan, Malaysia.
